Why Do Birds Sing? is the fifth studio album by Violent Femmes, released on April 30, 1991. It was the band's last album with original drummer Victor DeLorenzo, who left two years later to devote his time to acting, and was produced by Michael Beinhorn, best-known then for his work with the Red Hot Chili Peppers on Mother's Milk and The Uplift Mofo Party Plan.

The album featured the single "American Music," which rose to number 2 on Billboards Modern Rock chart during the week of May 18, 1991, and became a staple of the band's live shows.

Track listing

Personnel

Violent Femmes
 Gordon Gano – vocals, guitar
 Brian Ritchie – bass, guitar, bouzouki, banjo, ukulele, mouth harp, didgeridoo, xylophone, glockenspiel, vocals
 Victor DeLorenzo – drums, percussion, tranceaphone, vocals

Additional musicians
 Michael Beinhorn – Hammond organ on "American Music", Mellotron on "Do You Really Want To Hurt Me" and "Used To Be", piano on "Do You Really Want To Hurt Me" and "I'm Free", harmonium on "Used To Be"
 Sid Page, Suzie Katayama, Ilene Novog, Larry Corbett – strings on "Used To Be"
 Tommy Mandel – keyboards on "American Music"

Production
 Violent Femmes – Producer
 Eric "ET" Thorngren – Engineer, mixing
 David Vartanian – Mixing
 Susan Rogers – Engineer
 Tom Fritze – Assistant engineer
 Lori Fumar – Assistant engineer
 Mike Kloster – Assistant engineer
 Howie Weinberg – Mastering
 Mary Jones – Photography

Charts

Certifications

References

Violent Femmes albums
1991 albums
Albums produced by Michael Beinhorn
Reprise Records albums